Zanthoxylum punctatum, also known as the St. Thomas prickly-ash, is a species of plant in the family Rutaceae. It is found in Puerto Rico, the British Virgin Islands, and the United States Virgin Islands. Its natural habitats are tropical and subtropical dry broadleaf forests and shrublands. It is threatened by habitat loss, and is the only on St. John listed as "endangered".

References

punctatum
Endangered plants
Taxonomy articles created by Polbot
Taxobox binomials not recognized by IUCN